Polissena Ruffo (1400 Cariati - 17 July 1420) was a princess of Calabria. Princess of Rossano, countess of Corigliano and Montalto was the daughter of Carlo Ruffo di Montalto and Ceccarella Sanseverino.

She married Francesco Sforza (founder of the Sforza dynasty in Milan) in 1418 as his first wife.

References 

1400 births
1420 deaths
15th-century Italian women
15th-century Italian nobility
Polissena